Ben Page (born April 9, 1985 in Woodstock, Georgia) is a former American soccer player.

Career

College
Page played college soccer at Lipscomb University, where he earned four consecutive All-Conference Honors in his four-year career, and was the Carolina Gamecock Tournament MVP.

During his college years Page also played with the Southern California Seahorses in the USL Premier Development League.

Professional
Undrafted by Major League Soccer out of college, Page signed with Charlotte Eagles in 2008 . He made his professional debut on August 1, 2008, in Charlotte's 2008 season opener against Pittsburgh Riverhounds. He made 10 appearances in total for the Eagles in 2008, helping the team to the USL Second Division regular season title.

References

External links
 Charlotte Eagles bio

1985 births
Living people
People from Woodstock, Georgia
Sportspeople from the Atlanta metropolitan area
Soccer players from Georgia (U.S. state)
American soccer players
Association football forwards
Association football midfielders
Southern California Seahorses players
Charlotte Eagles players
USL Second Division players
USL League Two players
USL Championship players